Geocapromys is a genus of rodent belonging to the hutia subfamily and are currently only found on the Bahamas and Jamaica. However, they formerly ranged throughout the Caribbean, from Cuba to the Cayman Islands to even islands off mainland Central America.

Systematics
The genus Geocapromys comprises five recent species, three of which are extinct.
 G. brownii, the Jamaican hutia, which is also known as the Jamaican coney or Brown's hutia, is another extant species endemic to Jamaica.
 Geocapromys ingrahami, the Bahamian hutia or Ingraham's hutia, is an extant species of hutia native to the Bahamas. 
 G. thoracatus, the Little Swan Island hutia, was a third species which was found only on Little Swan Island, off northeastern Honduras. It became extinct in 1955, wiped out by storms and introduced predators. Some scientists consider it a subspecies of G. brownii.
G. columbianus, the Cuban coney, was endemic to Cuba, where it went extinct shortly after human colonization.
G. caymanensis, the Cayman hutia, was endemic to the Cayman Islands, where it went extinct shortly after human colonization.
In addition, there are two species, G. megas and G. pleistocenicus, which are known only from fossil remains.

Phylogeny
Within Capromyidae, Geocapromys  is the sister group to a clade comprising Mesocapromys and Mysateles on the one hand, and Capromys on the other hand. In turn, these four genera belong to the tribe Capromyini, and are the sister group to Plagiodontia.

References

 
Hutias
Rodent genera